Pardubice Crematorium is a crematorium in Pardubice, Czech Republic. It was designed by the Czech architect Pavel Janák in the Czech Art Deco style and built between 1921 and 1923. The project came from a tender that was opened at the end of 1918 and took place in 1919. Janák's project was chosen from 81 architectonical designs.

The design of the crematorium was influenced by old Slavic mythology and the concept of ancient Christian basilicas. Janák was inspired by Peter Behrens' conception of the crematorium in Hagen.

References

Buildings and structures in Pardubice
Buildings and structures completed in 1923
Crematoria in the Czech Republic
1923 establishments in Czechoslovakia
20th-century architecture in the Czech Republic